Melipotis acontioides, the royal poinciana moth, is a species of moth in the family Erebidae. It was first described by Achille Guenée in 1852. The species is found from the southern United States (including California, Arizona, New Mexico, Texas and Florida) through Mexico and Central America to Brazil, Argentina and the Galápagos Islands. It is also found in the Caribbean, including Cuba and the British Virgin Islands, Jamaica and Puerto Rico.

The wingspan is about 43 mm. The forewings are brown gray with dark brown spots. The hindwings are mostly white with a brown blotch towards the edge. Adults are on wing nearly year round.

The larvae feed on Delonix regia and Parkinsonia aculeata and Parkinsonia florida. The larvae feed at night. During the day, they hide in debris at the soil surface near the base of the tree. Pupation also takes place on the ground.

Subspecies
Melipotis acontioides acontioides
Melipotis acontioides producta Hayes, 1975 (Galápagos Islands)

References

Moths described in 1852
Melipotis